Adam Barrett Berry  (born December 3, 1966) is a two-time American Emmy-winning television and film composer and a  Grammy Award-winning producer and member of the  new age band White Sun. He is originally from Los Angeles. Some of his credits include South Park, Kim Possible, American Dragon: Jake Long, and The Sarah Silverman Program. He worked closely with Trey Parker and Matt Stone's in developing the scores for the first four seasons of South Park, and also played in their punk band, DVDA. As a member of new age band White Sun, Berry garnered a Grammy Award for best New Age album in 2017 for the album White Sun II.

Further reading
Nye, Sean. "From Punk to the Musical: South Park, Music, and the Cartoon Format." Music In Television: Channels of Listening, ed. James Deaville. London: Routledge, 2011. pp. 143–64.
Nye, Sean. "Generation X, South Park, and TV Music Composition: An Interview with Adam Berry.” Music In Television: Channels of Listening, ed. James Deaville. London: Routledge, 2011. pp. 217–26.

Filmography

Film

Television

References

External links

1966 births
American film score composers
American male film score composers
American television composers
Living people
Male television composers
Emmy Award winners
Grammy Award winners